The 2020 Virginia Tech Hokies women's soccer team represented Virginia Tech during the 2020 NCAA Division I women's soccer season. It was the 28th season of the university fielding a program and 17th competing in the Atlantic Coast Conference. The Hokies were led by 10th year head coach Charles Adair and played their home games at Thompson Field.

Due to the COVID-19 pandemic, the ACC played a reduced schedule in 2020 and the NCAA Tournament was postponed to 2021.  The ACC did not play a spring league schedule, but did allow teams to play non-conference games that would count toward their 2020 record in the lead up to the NCAA Tournament.

The Hokies finished the fall season 5–8–0, 4–4–0 in ACC play to finish in a tie for sixth place.  They were awarded the seventh seed in the ACC Tournament based on tiebreakers.  In the tournament they lost to North Carolina in the Quarterfinals.  They finished the spring season 3–1–0 and were not invited to the NCAA Tournament.

Previous season 

The Hokies finished the season 12–5–2, 4–4–2 in ACC play to finish in a tie for eight place.  They were not invited to the ACC Tournament.  They received an automatic bid to the NCAA Tournament where they lost to Xavier in the First Round.

Squad

Roster

Updated: February 11, 2021

Team management

Source:

Schedule 

Source:

|-
!colspan=6 style=""| Fall Regular season

|-
!colspan=6 style=""| ACC Tournament

|-
!colspan=6 style=""| Spring Regular season

Rankings

Fall 2020

Spring 2021

References 

Virginia Tech
Virginia Tech Hokies women's soccer seasons
2020 in sports in Virginia